The Sarda Primitiva is an indigenous breed of domestic goat from the Mediterranean island of Sardinia, off the west coast of Italy. It is quite distinct from the better-known Sarda breed of goat. It is raised in the mountainous areas of  the historic sub-regions of Ogliastra, of Sarrabus-Gerrei and of Sulcis-Iglesiente. It is one of the forty-three autochthonous Italian goat breeds of limited distribution for which a herdbook is kept by the Associazione Nazionale della Pastorizia, the Italian national association of sheep- and goat-breeders.

At the end of 2013 the registered population was 5399.

References

Goat breeds
Dairy goat breeds
Goat breeds originating in Italy